Jullian is a surname. Notable people with the surname include:

Camille Jullian (1859–1933), French historian, philologist, archaeologist and historian of French literature, student of Fustel de Coulanges
Ginette Jullian (1917–1962), French spy in World War II
Guillermo Jullian de la Fuente (1931–2008), Chilean architect and painter
Marcel Jullian (1922–2004), French screenwriter and author
Philippe Jullian (1919–1977), French illustrator, art historian, biographer, aesthete, novelist and dandy

See also
Julia (given name)
Julian (disambiguation)
Julianne